Cham Karteh (also Romanized as Cham Kerteh; also known as Chamkarda) is a village in Dorunak Rural District, Zeydun District, Behbahan County, Khuzestan Province, Iran. At the 2006 census, its population was 286, in 58 families.

References 

Populated places in Behbahan County